Finnish national road 19 is the Finnish highway leading from Kurikka, via Seinäjoki to Nykarleby. The length of the road is 121,4 kilometers. The road is a major transport intermediary in South and Central Ostrobothnia. The road belongs to the main roads defined by the Ministry of Transport and Communications. The road is mainly a good quality two-lane highway.

Highway 19 passes through the following municipalities: Kurikka–Ilmajoki–Seinäjoki–Lapua–Kauhava–Nykarleby. It starts at Kurikka's Jalasjärvi, where it diverges from Highway 3 (E12). The road runs in the area of Ilmajoki municipality and then past the city of Seinäjoki. From Seinäjoki, the road continues through the municipalities of Lapua and Kauhava to Ytterjeppo, Nykarleby, where it joins Highway 8 (E8). An eastern bypass was built from the road, which opened to traffic in November 2015 and facilitated better access from Seinäjoki to the south.

From 1938, Highway 19 was the road between Iisalmi and Pulkkila (now part of Siikalatva), until 1996 the road number changed to its current location and the road between Iisalmi and Pulkkila became the main road 88.

A popular PowerPark amusement park is located along the highway in Alahärmä, Kauhava.

Sources
 Autoilijan tiekartta 2007. AffectoGenimap Finland Oy, 2006. .

References

External links

Roads in Finland